Cali Agents is an American hip hop group, composed of California-based rappers Keida "Rasco" Brewer and Jason "Planet Asia" Green.

First appeared together on Rasco's Time Waits for No Man in 1998, the duo was billed as 'Cali Agents' on the 1999 single "Sophisticated Mic Pro's"/"Blood Brothaz" from Rasco's The Birth EP. They released their debut studio album How the West Was One in 2000, with its lead single "Good Life", which peaked at #36 on the Hot Rap Singles chart in the United States.

The group released their first compilation album Rasco & the Cali Agents Presents Hip Hop Classics Vol 1. in 2003, followed by releases of Head of the State (2004) and Fire & Ice (2006). In 2010, Seattle-based clothing company Iller Clothing released the duo's fourth project Close to Cash Pt.1.

Discography

Albums

Compilations
2003: Rasco & the Cali Agents Presents Hip Hop Classics Vol 1.

References

External links

Hip hop duos
American musical duos
Hip hop groups from California
African-American musical groups
Musical groups established in 1999
1999 establishments in California